Jeongjagwan is a type of gwanmo (관모; 冠帽), it is a traditional men's hat in Hanfu and Hanbok. It was first seen in the Five Dynasties at the latest. In the Song Dynasty, it was said that Cheng Yi（程颐） and Cheng Hao（程灏）, the Confucianists, often wore this kind of scarf, so they were also called 程子冠. The system of Jeongjagwan is slightly modified following the barrel-shaped Dongpo towel of the Song Dynasty. It is mainly woven with horsetail hair, and it was a hat worn by men from the yangban, the upper class of the Joseon period. It was mostly worn at home as a daily headgear instead of a gat, a formal headgear. Jeongjagwan is made with horse hair.

See also
Gat
Ayam
Hanbok

References

External links

Korean headgear
Hats